Elizabeth Grey, Countess of Kent (née Lady Elizabeth Talbot) (1582 – 7 December 1651) was a medical recipe collector, and the wife of Henry Grey, 8th Earl of Kent.

Biography
She was a daughter of Gilbert Talbot, 7th Earl of Shrewsbury and Mary Cavendish. She was appointed a maid of honour to Queen Elizabeth in June 1600.

She married Grey on 16 November 1601, at St Martin-in-the-Fields. They lived at Wrest Park, Bedfordshire, where she managed the large household. They had no children, and the Earl died in 1639. Afterwards she may have married the writer, John Selden, who had worked for the Earl and to whom she left most of her property.

She was a favourite attendant of Queen Anne of Denmark, As her husband was Baron Grey of Ruthin, she was named as "Lady Ruthin" in lists of Anne of Denmark's household. She is sometimes confused with Barbara Ruthven, the queen's favourite in Scotland in the 1590s. Lady Ruthin was a contact at court for Lady Anne Clifford, and took her gifts to Anne of Denmark, including a white satin gown embroidered with pearls and coloured silks. 

In 1610 she danced in the court masque Tethys' Festival as the "Nymph of Medway". In 1616 the Venetian ambassador Antonio Foscarini gave the Queen a necklace but Lady Grey returned it to him. It was said she replaced Jean Drummond as the queen's personal servant in October 1617. Her portrait by Paul van Somer includes a jewelled tablet or locket with the Queen's monogram. 

The queen's brother, Christian IV of Denmark wrote to her in 1619, asking her to take care to avert the Queen's melancholy. After Anne of Denmark's death, Christian IV wrote to her, thanking her for her service, and she replied from Somerset House in French.

Recipe books
After her death, her collection of medical recipes was published, originally as A Choice Manual, or Rare Secrets in Physick and Chirurgery Collected and Practised by the Right Honourable the Countess of Kent, late deceased. Later editions of the book added the subtitle Whereto are added several experiments of the vertue of Gascon powder, and lapis contra yarvam by a professor of physick. As also most exquisite ways of preserving, conserving, candying &c.. The book was popular, going through twenty-two editions. Some of the recipes reflect the influence of English Paracelsianism. Medical recipes were an interest she shared with her younger sister, Alethea Howard, Countess of Arundel.

A book published in 1653 by W. J. Gent, titled A True Gentlewoman's Delight, is considered to be her personal recipe collection, although there is speculation that the cookbook was written by the countess's chef Robert May, or by the publisher himself.

References

Attribution

External links
 A Choice Manual, or Rare Secrets in Physick and Chirurgery Collected and Practised by the Right Honourable the Countess of Kent (1726)

1582 births
1651 deaths
English countesses
Daughters of British earls
Elizabeth
Women cookbook writers
Household of Anne of Denmark